

Events

Arts and literature
If Christ Came To Chicago (non-fiction book) by William Thomas Stead

Births
Fred "Trigger" Burke, Egan's Rats member and freelance hitman 
John C. Montana, Magaddino crime family member 
Frank Scalise, Anastasia crime family underboss
Frankie Yale [Francesco Uale], Brooklyn Prohibition gangster

Deaths

Organized crime
Years in organized crime